Cheluveye Ninne Nodalu is a 2010 Indian Kannada-language film written and directed by D. P. Raghuram. It stars Shiva Rajkumar and Sonal Chauhan. The film was notable in that it had scenes shot in the seven wonders of the world.

Cast
 Shiva Rajkumar as Vishwanath
 Sonal Chauhan as Prakruthi
 Hariprriya as Sahana
 Chitra Shenoy as Sharada, Prakruthi's mother
 Chandrashekar as Desai, Prakruthi's father
 H. G. Dattatreya as Gopala Gowda
 Shanthamma as Shanthamma
 Venkatesh Prasad as Nikhil
 Kavya as Nischitha
 Tarun Sudheer as Manoj
 Sangeetha as Sumathi
 Avinash as Patil
 Vinaya Prasad as Sumithra
 Rekha Kumar as Pavani, Patil's daughter
 Nagashekar
 Mandeep Roy
 Ramesh Aravind as narrator
 Prem Kumar as Prem in a cameo appearance

Synopsis 
Vishwas (Shiva Rajkumar),also called as Vishwa by his friends. He is a poor, happy-going, carefree, humble and generous person. He is doing a job of a travel guide. Prakruthi (Sonal Chauhan), is arich girl but an introvert, who does not believe in the concepts of love and marriage because of the traumatic experience she went through in her childhood.  Vishwa makes her understand her believes are not true. His helping nature, simpleness attracted her. She falls for him instantly. How does she win his love forms the plot of the movie.

Production

Filming 

"Cheluveye Ninne Nodalu" Muhurat shot and formal launch was done on 11 December 2008 in Sri Durga Parameswari Temple at Vidyaranyapura in Bangalore, India. Principal photography began that day, as informed by the makers. On 18 March 2010, entire shooting of the film has been completed.

Soundtrack

V. Harikrishna scored the film's background score and the soundtrack. The soundtrack album consists of eight tracks. Lyrics for the tracks were written by V. Nagendra Prasad, Nagathihalli Chandrashekhar, S. Narayan and Yogaraj Bhat. A remixed version of the song "Huttidare Kannada" from the film Aakasmika (1993) was used in the film. The album was released on 30 November 2009  and was distributed in by Anand Audio. A Video CD was distributed along with the audio CD of the album that contained a 55-minute video of the film's making.

Reception

Critical response 

A critic from The Times of India scored the film at 3.5 out of 5 stars and says "While Sonal is simply superb, Haripriya is equally good. Dattanna, Prem, Tarun, Venkatesh Prasad have done justice to their roles. Kabir Lal's camera work is pleasing to the eyes. V Harikrishna walks away with all honours for his brilliant musical work. Chinthan, dialogue writer, needs special mention for his good work. A movie for the family audience". B S Srivani from Deccan Herald wrote "Dialogues by Chintan, cinematography by Kabir Lal and music by V Harikrishna all complement the director's vision, providing ample tour-time for the intrepid travellers. "Cheluveye..." is Shivanna's 98th release. The film is a must watch, not only for his fans but also families and armchair tourists".

References

2010 films
2010s Kannada-language films
2010 romance films
Films scored by V. Harikrishna
2010 directorial debut films
Indian romance films